François Gros (24 April 1925 – 18 February 2022) was a French biologist and one of the pioneers of cellular biochemistry in France. His scientific career concerned genes and their role in regulating cellular functions.

Honorary professor at the Collège de France, member of the Institute of France, he was also director of the Pasteur Institute (1976–1982) and advisor to Prime Ministers Pierre Mauroy and Laurent Fabius (1981–1985).

Elected correspondent (1977) then member (1979) of the French Academy of Sciences, he was permanent secretary from 1991 to 2000.

Gros died on 18 February 2022, at the age of 96.

External Links 

 François Gros obituary in Nature

References

1925 births
2022 deaths
20th-century French biologists
Scientists from Paris
Pasteur Institute
Members of the French Academy of Sciences
Foreign Fellows of the Indian National Science Academy
Grand Cross of the Ordre national du Mérite
Grand Officiers of the Légion d'honneur